Cyprinodon nevadensis is a species of pupfish in the genus Cyprinodon.  The species is also known as the Amargosa pupfish, but that name may also refer to one subspecies, Cyprinodon nevadensis amargosae.  All six subspecies are or were endemic to very isolated locations in the Mojave Desert of California and Nevada.

Subspecies
 Cyprinodon nevadensis amargosae, the Amargosa River pupfish or Amargosa Pupfish, was originally endemic to two sections of the lower Amargosa River. In 1940, a population was introduced at River Springs in Mono County, California.

 Cyprinodon nevadensis calidae, the Tecopa pupfish, was declared extinct in 1981, and was the first taxon to be removed from the endangered species list by virtue of extinction.
 Cyprinodon nevadensis mionectes, the Ash Meadows pupfish or Ash Meadows Amargosa pupfish, is listed as endangered under the Endangered Species Act.  It is limited to Ash Meadows National Wildlife Refuge in Nevada.
 Cyprinodon nevadensis nevadensis, the Saratoga Springs pupfish, was originally limited to Saratoga Springs in Death Valley National Park. A population was introduced at Lake Tuendae in Zzyzx, California, but it may not have survived there.
 Cyprinodon nevadensis pectoralis, the Warm Springs pupfish, is also listed as endangered under the ESA. It is restricted to six springs near Devils Hole in Nevada.
 Cyprinodon nevadensis shoshone, the Shoshone pupfish, is listed as a Species of Concern by the United States Fish and Wildlife Service. The fish is limited to Shoshone Spring, near the town of Shoshone, California, and possibly parts of the Amargosa River.

The book Relicts of a Beautiful Sea by Christopher Norment is an exploration of the history of, and present challenges, faced by this group of fish taxa.

References

nevadensis
Fauna of the Mojave Desert
Fish of the Western United States
Freshwater fish of the United States
Taxa named by Rosa Smith Eigenmann
Taxa named by Carl H. Eigenmann
Amargosa Desert
Desert National Wildlife Refuge Complex
Fish described in 1889